Buin is a city and commune of Chile, in the Maipo Province, Metropolitan Region of Santiago, which forms part of Greater Santiago. It is a city composed of the towns of Maipo, Viluco, Linderos, Valdivia de Paine, Alto Jahuel, Los Guindos and El Recurso.

Demographics
Of these, 53,506 (84.4%) lived in urban areas and 9,913 (15.6%) in rural areas. The population grew by 20.1% (10,627 persons) between the 1992 and 2002 censuses.

Administration
As a commune, Buin is a third-level administrative division of Chile administered by a municipal council, headed by an alcalde who is directly elected every four years. The 2012-2016 alcalde is Ángel Bozán Ramos (IND). The communal council has the following members:
 Patricio Silva Gonzalez (PPD)
 Hernán Henriquez Parrao (PRSD)
 Miguel Araya Lobos (UDI)
 Ramon Calderón Hormazábal (PDC)
 Sandra Meneses Tapia (PPD)
 Nicolás Romo Contreras (UDI)

Within the electoral divisions of Chile, Buin is represented in the Chamber of Deputies by Ramón Farías (PPD) and José Antonio Kast (UDI) as part of the 30th electoral district, (together with San Bernardo, Paine and Calera de Tango). The commune is represented in the Senate by Guido Girardi Lavín (PPD) and Jovino Novoa Vásquez (UDI) as part of the 7th senatorial constituency (Santiago-West).

References

External links 
  Official site of City of Buin
  Second site of Buin

Communes of Chile
Populated places in Maipo Province
1844 establishments in Chile